Dominica is a sovereign island country. Bananas and other agriculture dominate Dominica's economy, and nearly one-third of the labour force works in agriculture. This sector, however, is highly vulnerable to weather conditions and to external events affecting commodity prices. In 2007, Hurricane Dean caused significant damage to the agricultural sector as well as the country's infrastructure, especially roads. In response to reduced European Union (EU) banana trade preferences, the government has diversified the agricultural sector by promoting the production of coffee, patchouli, aloe vera, cut flowers, and exotic fruits such as mango, guava, and papaya.

Notable firms 
This list includes notable companies with primary headquarters located in the country. The industry and sector follow the Industry Classification Benchmark taxonomy. Organizations which have ceased operations are included and noted as defunct.

See also

References 

Dominica